Willie Jake Reed (born September 28, 1967) is a former professional American football player who played for 12 seasons in the National Football League (NFL) as a wide receiver from 1991 to 2002 for the Minnesota Vikings and the New Orleans Saints. Reed played collegiately at Grambling State University and was selected by the Vikings in the third round of the 1991 NFL Draft, a pick that the Vikings acquired in the Herschel Walker trade. Reed is the father of J. R. Reed, who is a safety for the Denver Broncos.

NFL career

Reed had four 1,000-yard seasons in his career with a career-high of 85 receptions in 1994. He was second in receiving yards in the NFL with 1,320 in the 1996 season. Reed finished his career with 450 receptions for 6,999 yards and 36 touchdowns.

In 1994, Reed combined with fellow receiver Cris Carter for 207 receptions, which was an NFL record at the time. Carter and Reed combined to become the first teammate duo to amass 1,000 yards each in four consecutive seasons. Reed was NFC Offensive Player of the Month in September 1997 after 34 catches for 521 yards. Reed would also make 12 plays of 50+ yards with Minnesota, second in team history.

References 

1967 births
Living people
People from Covington, Georgia
Sportspeople from the Atlanta metropolitan area
Players of American football from Georgia (U.S. state)
American football wide receivers
Grambling State Tigers football players
Minnesota Vikings players
New Orleans Saints players